The Ministry of Education was a government ministry of Rhodesia from the country's independence in 1965 to 1979, when the country transitioned from white minority rule to the multiracial democracy of Zimbabwe.

First established in 1948, with the establishment of the Federation of Rhodesia and Nyasaland the responsibility for non-african and higher education was a federal responsibility from 1954 to 1963. In 1956 Prime Minister Garfield Todd established the Ministry of Native Education, with the responsibility for black African education, which was later renamed the Ministry for African Education from 1962. The Ministry of African Education was abolished by Prime Minister Ian Smith in 1964.

List of Ministers of Education

Minister of Education

Minister of Native/African Education

References

Education
Education ministers
Education ministries
Education
Education
1965 establishments in Rhodesia
Education, Ministry of